The Superior mine is one of the largest graphite mines in Canada and in the world. The mine is located in the west of the country in British Columbia. The mine has estimated reserves of 240 million tonnes of ore 9% graphite.

References

External Links
http://aris.empr.gov.bc.ca/ArisReports/26272A.PDF
http://aris.empr.gov.bc.ca/ArisReports/26566A.PDF
http://www.fortunegraphite.com/docs/Technical%20Report%20Superior%20Koch%20Amar%20NI43-101.pdf

Graphite mines in Canada
Mines in British Columbia